Brucita is a genus of skeletonizing leaf beetles in the family Chrysomelidae. There is one described species in Brucita, B. marmorata. They are found in Texas and Guatemala.

References

Further reading

 
 
 
 

Galerucinae
Monotypic Chrysomelidae genera
Articles created by Qbugbot
Beetles of North America